Carleton Davidson Stadium is a stadium in Springfield, Ohio. It is used for collegiate level baseball by the Wittenberg University Tigers and the Champion City Kings. The facility holds 1,077 people. The stadium is considered to be a pitcher's park with the dimensions of 390 to center, 350 to the power alleys, and 320 down the lines.

Stadium facts 
 1,077 total seats 
 177 open air individual back with arm rest seats
 900 bench seats, in covered grandstand
 Wheel chair seating areas provided
 Fully accessible restrooms
 Complete press box,  electronically wired
 Locker rooms
 Umpire dressing room
 Automated sound system
 Lighted parking
 Picnic area and covered pavilion / shelter house

References

Baseball venues in Ohio
Buildings and structures in Springfield, Ohio
College baseball venues in the United States
Minor league baseball venues